The 1946 Men's World Weightlifting Championships were held in Paris, France, from October 18 to October 19, 1946. There were 79 men in action from 13 nations.

Medal summary

Medal table

References
Results (Sport 123)
Weightlifting World Championships Seniors Statistics

External links
International Weightlifting Federation

World Weightlifting Championships
World Weightlifting Championships
International weightlifting competitions hosted by France
World Weightlifting Championships